Wuzhi (died 685 BC), also called Gongsun Wuzhi (公孫無知, Gongsun meaning grandson of a duke), was for a few months in early 685 BC ruler of the State of Qi during the Spring and Autumn period of ancient China.  His personal name was Lü Wuzhi (呂無知), ancestral name Jiang (姜).  Unlike most rulers, he was not given a posthumous title because he killed the monarch and usurped the throne.

Early life
Wuzhi's father Yi Zhongnian was a son of Duke Zhuang I of Qi and younger brother of Duke Xi of Qi.  Yi Zhongnian died in 699 BC, but Wuzhi's uncle Duke Xi loved him and gave him the same treatment as his son, Crown Prince Zhu'er.  However, the next year Duke Xi died and Zhu'er, Wuzhi's cousin, ascended the throne (posthumously known as Duke Xiang of Qi).  Duke Xiang disliked Wuzhi and demoted his status.

Murdering Duke Xiang
In the twelfth month of 686 BC, the twelfth year of his reign, Duke Xiang injured his foot on a hunting trip.  When the duke was recovering in his palace, Wuzhi killed him with the help of generals Lian Cheng (連稱) and Guan Zhifu (管至父), who had been mistreated by Duke Xiang.

Death and succession
Wuzhi usurped the Qi throne after murdering Duke Xiang, but was killed by minister Yong Lin (雍廩) just a few months later in spring 685 BC.  After a brief struggle between Duke Xiang's two younger brothers Prince Jiu and Prince Xiaobai, Xiaobai would prevail and ascend the throne, posthumously known as Duke Huan of Qi.  Qi would grow strong under Duke Huan's rule, and Duke Huan subsequently became the first of the Five Hegemons of the Spring and Autumn period.

Ancestry

References

Monarchs of Qi (state)
7th-century BC Chinese monarchs
685 BC deaths
Year of birth unknown
7th-century BC murdered monarchs
Assassinated Chinese politicians